Translation and Literature is an academic journal of English literature in its foreign relations. The journal was established in 1992 with Stuart Gillespie (University of Glasgow) as editor-in-chief.

Overview
Articles and notes have included: Surrey and Marot, Livy and Jacobean drama, Virgil in Paradise Lost, Pope’s Horace, Fielding on translation, Browning’s Agamemnon, and Brecht in English. The journal's remit includes responses to other literatures in the work of English writers, including reception of classical texts; historical and contemporary translation of works in modern languages; history and theory of literary translation, adaptation, and imitation.

References

External links

NAATI Certified Translation
Translation and Literature on JSTOR
Translation and Literature on Project MUSE

Triannual journals
Translation studies
Translation journals
English-language journals
Literary translation magazines
Publications established in 1992
Edinburgh University Press academic journals
Literary magazines published in the United Kingdom